Steven Berkowitz (born September 4, 1958) was CEO of Move, Inc. After serving on the board of directors of Move, Inc. for nearly a year, Steve was selected by the board to succeed Michael Long to serve as the company's CEO. After completing the acquisition of Move by Newscorp, his tenure ended on January 5, 2015.

He has a bachelor's degree in accounting from the University at Albany, SUNY. His former house at 2795 Evergreen Point Road in Medina, Washington, USA was featured in a residential architecture magazine as well as 425 Magazine.

Prior to joining Move, he served as Senior Vice President of the Online Services Group at Microsoft Corporation (NASDAQ:MSFT). There, Berkowitz was responsible for running the Online Business group, which includes MSN.com, MSN TV and MSN Internet Access programming, advertising sales, business development, and marketing for Live Platform, MSN and Windows Live.

Before joining Microsoft in May 2006, Berkowitz served as chief executive officer of Ask Jeeves, an online search engine, from January 2004 until August 2005, when the business was sold to IAC/InterActiveCorp (NASDAQ:IACI). After its acquisition by IAC/InterActiveCorp., Ask Jeeves was renamed IAC Search and Media, and Berkowitz served as its chief executive officer until May 2006. Berkowitz was president of the Web Properties Division of Ask Jeeves from May 2001 until December 2003.

Career history

Lumosity
CEO (November 2, 2015  to Current)
Lumosity is an online program and mobile application consisting of games challenge you in the areas of memory, attention, flexibility, speed of processing, and problem solving.

Bazzarvoice
Board Member (October 2015 to current)

Move, Inc.
CEO (January 21, 2009 to January 5, 2015)
Board Member (June 2008 to January 5, 2015)

The Ladders
Board Member (July, 2008 to September 2013)

Microsoft
Senior Vice President, Online Services Group (May, 2006 to September 2008)

https://www.nytimes.com/2006/12/09/technology/09msn.html?pagewanted=all

References

1958 births
American technology chief executives
Living people
Microsoft employees
National Medal of Technology recipients
People from Medina, Washington
People from Alamo, California
University at Albany, SUNY alumni